The Presidio–Ojinaga International Bridge, also known simply as the Presidio Bridge and Puente Ojinaga, is an international bridge that crosses the Rio Grande (Río Bravo) between the cities of Presidio, Texas, and Ojinaga, Chihuahua, on the United States–Mexico border. It connects U.S. Route 67 to the north with Mexican Federal Highway 16 to the south. The bridge is privately owned and is tolled. It was completed and opened in 1985.

Border crossing

The Presidio Texas Port of Entry is located at the Presidio–Ojinaga International Bridge. The original, privately-owned wooden bridge was built in the early 1900s, and the port of entry was established by executive order in 1917.  The bridge was most recently replaced in 1985. The current border inspection station was completed about two years later.

See also
Presidio–Ojinaga International Rail Bridge, the parallel rail bridge
List of crossings of the Rio Grande

References

International bridges in Texas
International bridges in Chihuahua (state)
Toll bridges in Texas
Bridges completed in 1985
Buildings and structures in Presidio County, Texas
Transportation in Presidio County, Texas
Road bridges in Texas
U.S. Route 67
Bridges of the United States Numbered Highway System
Toll bridges in Mexico
1985 establishments in Mexico
1985 establishments in Texas